William Paul (1875–1942) was a New Zealand politician.

Political activity
Born at Waimate, New Zealand in 1875, Paul was a shearer and farmer. He was the NZLP candidate for Waitaki in 1911 and 1919 then stood as an Independent Labour candidate in 1922.

William Paul served on the Waimate Borough Council for 29 years (1913–42) and was deputy Mayor in 1942 at the time of his death.

Further reading
Labour's Path to Political Independence: the Origins and Establishment of the NZLP 1900-19 by Barry Gustafson (1980, Oxford University Press, Auckland)

1875 births
1942 deaths
New Zealand farmers
Local politicians in New Zealand
New Zealand Labour Party politicians
Unsuccessful candidates in the 1911 New Zealand general election
Unsuccessful candidates in the 1919 New Zealand general election
Unsuccessful candidates in the 1922 New Zealand general election
People from Waimate